Nimu Bhowmik  (4 November 193527 August 2019) was an Indian actor recognized for his work in Bengali cinema. and considered to be one of the famous comic actors and villains of Bengali Cinema.

Career 
His debut film Bagha Jatin was released in 1958 and second important film Monihar was released in 1966. He acted in about 60 films portraying the role of a typical Bengali man and was acclaimed by viewers for his natural acting skill. He portrayed characters of different shades in 'Ganadebata' (1979), 'Baghini' (1968), 'Dadar Kirti' (1980), 'Guru Dakshina' (1987). He was a favourite actor of director Tarun Majumder. His last film was 'Dos Mas Dos Diner Golpo' released in the year 2019. Nimu Bhowmick directed a movie named 'Protyaborton'.

Political career 
He joined the BJP and unsuccessfully contested Lok Sabha election from Raiganj constituency in 2014.

Filmography 
 Bagha Jatin (film), 1958
 Monihaar 1966,
 Baghini 1968,
 Dui Prithibi 1970,
 Strir Patra 1972
 Chhera Tamsuk (1974)
 Bikele Bhorer Phul (1974),
 Gonodevta 1978,
 Dadar Kirti 1980,
 Saheb 1981,
 Guru Dakshina (1987),
 Choto Bou  (1988)
 Pratik (1988),
 Mangal Deep (1989)
 Sinthir Sindoor 1996,
 Aporajita 1998,
 Nodir Pare Amer Bari 2001,
 Pratibad 2001,
Sathi (2002 film), Indian Bengali film released in 2002,
 Sangee 2003,
 Nater Guru 2003,
 Tulkalam 2007,
 Ekti Muhurter Jonyo (2014),
 Achena Bondhutto (2015),
 Protyaborton 2015,
 Nabab 2017,
 Dos Mas Dos Diner Golpo 2019
 Khuda 2019

References 

1935 births
2019 deaths
20th-century Indian actors
Bengali theatre personalities